Bzzz! is an American relationship game show that first aired in limited syndication, produced by Ralph Edwards-Stu Billett Productions in cooperation with Tribune Entertainment, which handled distribution.

The series premiered on January 22, 1996 for a limited trial run, primarily on Tribune's own group of stations; it later expanded to full national syndication for one season, airing from September 9, 1996 to September 5, 1997, with reruns continuing on some stations until 2001. The show was hosted by Annie Wood, who also served as co-producer.
 
Reruns of the series were first aired on Superstation WGN from 2000 to 2001 (including the original "trial run" season), while Buzzr aired the series Saturday nights from February 15, 2020 to July 25, 2020.

Premise
The show itself was a fast-paced variant of The Dating Game in which a bachelor and bachelorette competed against each other to win a date with a member of the opposite sex, as well as money.

External links
Official Website

1996 American television series debuts
1997 American television series endings
1990s American game shows
American dating and relationship reality television series
Television series by Tribune Entertainment
Television series by Ralph Edwards Productions
English-language television shows
First-run syndicated television programs in the United States